Hwang Woo-jin (also Hwang Wu-Jin, born May 8, 1990 in Gwangju) is a modern pentathlete from South Korea. He competed for the modern pentathlon at the 2012 Summer Olympics in London, along with his compatriot Jung Jin-hwa.

"Careless"
Hwang merely called himself Careless, because he made numerous slight mistakes in his modern pentathlon career. He became one of the major highlights in the men's event at the 2012 Olympics, when his horse Shearwater Oscar threw him off the ground before he had even started his round in the riding segment. With the time already running and his left leg injured from the fall, Hwang set off the course, and managed to jump aboard, only for Shearwater Oscar to kick over the fence. Hwang finished with 464 obstacle and time penalties by a warm applause from the audience. Following his fair scores in fencing and swimming, and his disastrous and sudden fall in riding, Hwang placed thirty-fourth out of thirty-six competitors in the men's event.

Hwang also won two gold medals at the 2011 UIPM Junior World Championships in Buenos Aires, Argentina.

References

External links
  (archived page from Pentathlon.org)
 

South Korean male modern pentathletes
1990 births
Living people
Olympic modern pentathletes of South Korea
Modern pentathletes at the 2012 Summer Olympics
Sportspeople from Gwangju
Korea National Sport University alumni
Asian Games medalists in modern pentathlon
Modern pentathletes at the 2014 Asian Games
World Modern Pentathlon Championships medalists
Medalists at the 2014 Asian Games
Asian Games bronze medalists for South Korea
20th-century South Korean people
21st-century South Korean people